Elverum Stadion, also known as Sentralidrettsplassen is a football stadium located in Elverum, Norway. It is the home ground of Elverum Fotball in the 2. divisjon. Elverum Stadion acquired artificial turf in 2006. They had new artificial turf put in and further renovated the stadium in 2013 ahead of the 2013 season where Elverum made their comeback at the second tier of Norwegian football after a 17-year absence. After the renovation the capacity of Elverum Stadion is 1,400.

The record attendance at Elverum Stadion is 4,633. The record was set when Elverum played rivals Ham-Kam 1 September 1991. Ham-Kam won the game 3–0.

References

External links
Official website

Football venues in Norway
Bandy venues in Norway
Sports venues in Innlandet
Elverum
Sports venues completed in 1950
1950 establishments in Norway